

The Factory in Deep Ellum, formerly The Bomb Factory, is an American live music venue and event space located in the Deep Ellum district of downtown Dallas, Texas. It originally operated from 1993 to 1997 and was reopened in March 2015 under new management. Since its reopening, the venue has hosted acts including Erykah Badu, Sturgill Simpson, Robert Plant of Led Zeppelin, Disclosure, Don Henley of The Eagles, Future, D'Angelo, Brand New, Hardwell, Chvrches, Kraftwerk, Ludacris and most notably Hatsune Miku.

History

1914–1970 

In 1914, Henry Ford acquired this site for one of his first automobile assembly plants. The plant, along with the present day Adam Hats building, remained in the 2700 block of Williams Street (now known as Canton Street) until the 1930s.

At the turn of World War II, Ford was pushed to help the United States gear up for war. The manufacturing of automobiles ceased, as the production of jeeps, practice bombs, and ammunition for the war effort began under the new company name Mayhew Machine and Engineering Works (present day Bomb Factory). With an impending economic recession, the Factory closed down in the 1970s.

In the early 1990s, Deep Ellum attracted industrial developments, commercial storefronts, and early musical cultures such as jazz and blues. The Bomb Factory resurfaced as one of the largest music venues in Deep Ellum. Towards the end of the decade, Deep Ellum took another downturn forcing many venues and businesses to shutter its doors.

In recent years, the Deep Ellum neighborhood has flourished economically and culturally and continues to thrive, dedicating the area primarily to local arts, music, and businesses. Under new ownership, the Bomb Factory reopened March 2015 as a turnkey venue hosting concerts, private parties, banquets, company meetings and more.

1993–1997 
The Bomb Factory first opened its doors as a music venue in 1993 and hosted acts including Ramones, Sonic Youth, and Phish, whose "Tweezerfest" performance at The Bomb Factory in 1994 has since become a fan favorite, before its closure in 1997. Additionally, The Bomb Factory also saw acts including Megadeth, Korn, Fugees, Black Sabbath, Rage Against the Machine, Fugazi, INXS, Marilyn Manson, Tool, Motörhead, Nine Inch Nails, Slayer, and Dave Matthews Band during its initial run as a venue.

On Wednesday, August 9, 1995, the first ever run of the Warped Tour came through Dallas and took place in the parking lot of The Bomb Factory. L7, Sublime, and Quicksand headlined the concert, with support from No Use for a Name, Sick of It All, Fluf, Seaweed, and Tilt.

2015–present 
In November 2013, Trees Dallas owner Clint Barlow announced that he would be resurrecting The Bomb Factory after 15 years. The multimillion dollar project detailed plans for a complete renovation of the space, including air conditioning, the installation of mezzanine seating, eight VIP suites, a centered stage with unobstructed views, a raised roof, and state of the art lights and sound systems. Additionally, the renovation plans for backstage featured four green rooms with laundry and shower facilities, as well as a gym for touring artists. On Thursday, March 26, 2015, The Bomb Factory opened its doors to the public with a sold-out grand opening concert, headlined by Erykah Badu with support from Dallas-based singer/songwriter, Sarah Jaffe.

Since its grand opening, the 48,000-square-foot venue has seen acts including The Lumineers, Sturgill Simpson, Robert Plant, Disclosure, Don Henley, Future, D'Angelo, Brand New, Hardwell, Chvrches, and Ms. Lauryn Hill, held events including the Elm Street Music and Tattoo Festival, and corporate events for companies including Jaguar, Raising Cane's, and Dallas Observer.

In addition to booking live music, festivals, conventions, and private events, The Bomb Factory frequently hosts boxing and mixed martial arts events. On Saturday, November 28, 2015, The Bomb Factory hosted the Premier Boxing Champions Super Welterweight World Championship, which was televised on NBC. Jermall Charlo and Wilky Campfort were the title fighters. On Saturday, January 9, 2016, Dominion Warrior presented an MMA Fight Night at The Bomb Factory. The event featured primarily local fighters. Top Rank presented Bomb Factory Fight Club at The Bomb Factory on Saturday, January 16, 2016. The event featured a lightweight match between Eric De Leon and Fidel Navarette and a middleweight fight between Matt Korobov and Jose Obando as the co-main events. The fights were televised on UniMás Network in the United States.

On October 31, 2017, Clint and Whitney Barlow reopened Deep Ellum Live as Canton Hall, an indoor music venue capable of holding up to 1100 people.

On July 12, 2021, The Bomb Factory was renamed The Factory in Deep Ellum.

Notable events 
 The venue's sold-out March 2015 grand opening was headlined by Erykah Badu with support from Sarah Jaffe, both Dallas natives.
 In October 2015, Dallas hip hop legend, The D.O.C., performed at The Bomb Factory for his return show, his first performance since his near-fatal car accident 20 years ago.
 The Bomb Factory hosted the second annual Rageville Music Fest on October 30, 2015, headlined by Future. The festival also featured performances by Paper Diamond, 12th Planet, AraabMuzik, and Keith Ape.
 On Tuesday, March 15, 2016, Robert Plant and his band, the Sensational Shapeshifters, performed at The Bomb Factory, with support from The Sonics. Plant performed songs from both his solo work and his time in Led Zeppelin, and after a 90 minute set, Plant returned to the stage for an encore.
 On March 29, 2016, the Dallas Mavericks hosted a Ludacris concert at The Bomb Factory, the first concert promoted by the team's event company, Another Mavericks Production. Dallas hip hop artists Cure for Paranoia, Bobby Sessions, and -topic were the support, each of whom were given full sets. During -topic's set, Dallas native Leon Bridges briefly joined the rapper onstage.
Don Henley performed at The Bomb Factory on April 29, 2016, for the annual ESD Gala, a private benefit for the Episcopal School of Dallas.
On August 11, 2016, Mark Cuban's network, AXS TV, launched a five-week concert series featuring performances by The Monkees, Bret Michaels, KC and the Sunshine Band, and Bad Company. The Monkees celebrated their 50th anniversary with this show, which was free to attend and filled to capacity.

Awards 
 Dallas Observer Music Awards, Best New Music Venue – 2015
 D Magazine Best of Big D, Best Local Music Venue – 2015
 Dallas Observer: The 5 Best New Concert Venues in Dallas/Fort Worth – 2015
 Consequence of Sound: The 100 Greatest American Music Venues, #86 – 2016
 Dallas Observer Music Awards, Best Music Venue (over 500 capacity) – 2016
 D Magazine Best of Big D, Best Live Music Venue – 2016

References

External links 

 

Buildings and structures completed in 1914
Concert halls in Texas
Music venues completed in 1993
Music venues in Dallas
Nightclubs in Texas